The 2010–11 season was French football club Paris Saint-Germain's 12th season in Division 1 Féminine and their 10th consecutive season in the top division of French football. Paris Saint-Germain was managed by Camillo Vaz - in his second season since replacing Éric Leroy. The club was chaired by Pierre Noguès. Paris Saint-Germain was present in the 2010–11 Division 1 Féminine and the 2010–11 Challenge de France. Christophe Dedouche replaced Karine Noilhan as assistant coach. During the summer, the face of the team changed slightly. Three players left the capital club: Ingrid Boyeldieu, Émilie L'Huillier and Stéphanie Hoffele. Montpellier's Léa Rubio and Montigny's Léa Le Garrec, both champions with France in the 2010 UEFA Women's Under-19 Championship, signed for Paris Saint-Germain. Charlotte Lozè, also from Montpellier, joined former Lyon striker Kátia at the club. As seen in Zohra Ayachi's words, Paris Saint-Germain was aiming for a second place in the league to dispute the UEFA Women's Champions League next season:

Squad
French teams are limited to four players without EU citizenship. The squad list includes only the principal nationality of each player; several non-European players on the squad have dual citizenship with an EU country. Also, players from the ACP countries—countries in Africa, the Caribbean, and the Pacific that are signatories to the Cotonou Agreement—are not counted against non-EU quotas due to the Kolpak ruling.

Board and staff

Division 1 Féminine

Paris Saint-Germain suffered a crushing defeat to Montpellier only alleviated by Laure Lepailleur's consolation goal. Élise Bussaglia's strike after a defensive error was enough to claim PSG's first victory of the season in a highly contested match against Yzeure. "Les Parisiennes" first match at home ended with a win over Rodez as Kátia, PSG's star signing, scored in her debut at the Stade Georges Lefèvre. Paris claimed all three points away to Saint-Étienne thanks to Élise Bussaglia's free kick which became her third goal of the season. PSG Ladies followed the steps of their male associates and defeated Toulouse at the Camp des Loges thanks to a fourth consecutive goal in four matches from Élise Bussaglia. Paris Saint-Germain continued their good run defeating Hénin-Beaumont by a margin of four goals. "Les Rouge-et-Bleu" recorded an impressive fourth consecutive victory and climbed into the podium, tied with Montpellier and just three points from leaders Lyon.

Brazilian star Kátia opened the score for Paris Saint-Germain against Saint-Brieuc as Camillo Vaz's ladies recorded their sixth consecutive victory and consolidated their place in the podium. "Les Parisiennes" returned to action for their Week 15 match against Toulouse which was brought forward. PSG took the lead through Charlotte Lozè early in the first half before Kátia, Élise Bussaglia and Candice Prévost signed three more goals as they recorded a second victory over Toulouse. Caroline Pizzala and Sabrina Delannoy found the net as the capital club came from behind to beat Yzeure. PSG claimed all three points away to Rodez thanks to Élise Bussaglia's seventh goal of the season after a smoothly conducted team work. Paris fell to their second defeat of the season as leaders Lyon came from behind at the Stade Georges Lefèvre. Brazilian striker Kátia scored PSG's goal in a wondrous display. Élise Bussaglia's goal from the penalty spot against Saint-Étienne earned Paris a spot in the podium as they reached third in the Division 1 Féminine. PSG withstood the French champion during the first half, but Lyon dominated an extremely defensive capital side which conceded three goals in the second period. PSG's Champions League hopes suffered a major blow as Hénin-Beaumont came from behind to win at the Camp des Loges.

Élise Bussaglia scored in each half to defeat Le Mans and keep Paris Saint-Germain in the hunt for the European Cup. Kátia's brace and a superb header from Sabrina Delannoy against Saint-Brieuc allowed Paris to go level with Montpellier in second place. Kátia's ninth Division 1 goal of the season got the ball rolling for PSG as they ran out home winners over arch-rivals Juvisy to stand second in the table. Kátia took her tally to 10 Division 1 strikes as the Brazilian struck to keep Paris in the race for Champions League football with a win over La Roche. Kátia notched her club-leading 11th Division 1 goal of the season as PSG enjoyed a home win over Le Mans. Brazilian star Kátia produced a virtuoso performance crowned by two goals as Paris condemned La Roche to a fifth defeat in five Division 1 games. Sabrina Delannoy struck her 5th goal of the season from the penalty spot as PSG qualified to the Champions League for the first time in their history with a decisive victory over second-placed Montpellier. Élise Bussaglia confirmed her continuing ascendancy in the French game by collecting the coveted Division 1 Player of the Year award.

League table

Results summary

Results by round

Challenge de France
Paris Saint-Germain entered the 2010–11 Challenge de France season as defending champions having won the title last season in a one-sided Final against Montpellier at the Stade Robert Bobin. A masterful display saw PSG claim their first major title and most prestigious honour to date. Division 1 sides entered the draw for the Second Round and Paris Saint-Germain began their defence of the trophy visiting Division 2 side Issy. Zohra Ayachi struck a hat-trick as Challenge de France holders PSG cruised to victory in Issy. Camillo Vaz's ladies stormed home as they scored a record ten goals against their weak opponents to secure a place in the last-32. Paris Saint-Germain began their defence of the trophy by putting ten past Issy, and then faced a trip to Alsace to play Vendenheim of the second division. The French Football Federation validated the appeal to replace the Challenge de France Féminin for the Coupe de France Féminine from the 2011–12 season onwards. A Joanna Schwartz strike midway through the second half took Vendenheim into the last-16 at the expense of Paris Saint-Germain after a nervy evening at the Stade Waldeck.

Reserves and academy

References

External links

Official Websites
 PSG.fr
 Paris Saint-Germain at Footofeminin
 Paris Saint-Germain at UEFA

News Sites
 Paris Saint-Germain News from Le Parisien
 Paris Saint-Germain News at FFF

French football clubs 2010–11 season
2010-11
2010–11 in French women's football